The 2019–20 Denver Pioneers men's basketball team represented the University of Denver in the 2019–20 NCAA Division I men's basketball season. The Pioneers, led by fourth-year head coach Rodney Billups, played their home games at Magness Arena in Denver, Colorado, with two games at Hamilton Gymnasium, as members of the Summit League. They finished the season 7–24, 3–13 in Summit League play to finish in eighth place. They lost in the quarterfinals of the Summit League tournament to North Dakota State.

Previous season
The Pioneers finished the 2018–19 season 8–22, 3–13 in Summit League play to finish in last place. They failed to qualify for the 2019 Summit League tournament.

Roster

Schedule and results

|-
!colspan=12 style=| Exhibition

|-
!colspan=12 style=| Non-conference regular season

|-
!colspan=9 style=| Summit League regular season

|-
!colspan=12 style=| Summit League tournament
|-

|-

Source

References

Denver Pioneers men's basketball seasons
Denver Pioneers
Denver Pioneers men's basketball
Denver Pioneers men's basketball